10, Low Pavement is a Grade II listed building in Nottingham.

History
The building was constructed in 1876 to the designs of the architect, Alfred Smith. It was built for Thomas Jones Rowe, tailor and outfitter. The front is designed in the 13th century gothic style, with a base of brown Whitby stone, two windows are supported by pillars of Irish red marble and Scottish granite in white and blue overhead. The first floor provided offices, cutting-rooms and was used for the display of goods. The second floor, reached by a staircase contained a retiring room for patrons. The etched window panes, chandeliers and fittings were custom-made. It has been described as a wild version of William Burges.

Thomas Jones Rowe died in 1895 and by 1902 it was occupied by William Malin Hunt, Sons & Bright, electrical engineers, valuers and surveyors. By 1912 it was the offices of the Atlas Assurance Company Limited.

References

Grade II listed buildings in Nottinghamshire
Buildings and structures in Nottingham
Buildings and structures completed in 1876
Gothic Revival architecture in Nottinghamshire